Groovy is an album by jazz pianist Red Garland and his trio, released in 1957 on Prestige Records.

Reception

In his review on AllMusic, Michael G. Nastos states: "Red Garland's third recording as a leader has him playing very well, somewhat energetic and more inclusive in his direction to span the mainstream jazz palate beyond the cool exterior he emanates. The title might be a bit deceptive, for this is not a project where soul-jazz or early boogaloo influences turned jazzmen into groovemeisters -- it's a swinging groove. ... It is said that by the third recording, most musicians should have their style down pat and begin attempting to take the music to a higher level. You really hear that in this recording, which was a springboard to making Red Garland one of the most revered and respected jazz pianists of the modern era."

Track listing 
"C-Jam Blues" (Barney Bigard, Duke Ellington) – 8:21
"Gone Again" (Curtis Lewis, Curley Hamner, Gladys Hampton) – 6:46
"Will You Still Be Mine?" (Matt Dennis, Tom Adair) – 4:43
"Willow Weep for Me" (Ann Ronell) – 9:35
"What Can I Say, Dear" (Walter Donaldson, Abe Lyman) – 7:14
"Hey Now" (Red Garland) – 3:41

Personnel 
Red Garland – piano
Paul Chambers – bass
Art Taylor – drums

References 

1957 albums
Albums produced by Bob Weinstock
Prestige Records albums
Red Garland albums
Albums recorded at Van Gelder Studio